Kazawa Dam is an earthfill dam located in Gunma Prefecture in Japan. The dam is used for power production. The catchment area of the dam is 72.5 km2. The dam impounds about 78  ha of land when full and can store 5634 thousand cubic meters of water. The construction of the dam was started on 1926 and completed in 1927.

References

Dams in Gunma Prefecture